Lamb tandoori or tandoori kebab (Turkish: Kuzu tandır or tandır kebabı), is a meat dish in Turkish cuisine. It belongs to the Akşehir region. It is prepared with lamb, onion, tomato, potato and peppers. Lamb pieces (sometimes a whole lamb) baked in an oven called a tandır, which requires a special way of cooking for hours. Served with bread and raw onions.

References 

Kebabs
Lamb dishes
Turkish cuisine
Turkish words and phrases